Inge Paulsen (23 August 1924 – 4 September 2013) was a Norwegian football striker.

Paulsen mostly played for Viking, but in the 1950–51 season he played for Rouen in Ligue 2 and Sochaux in Ligue 1. He represented Norway as a B and senior international.

References

1924 births
2013 deaths
Sportspeople from Stavanger
Norwegian footballers
Viking FK players
FC Rouen players
FC Sochaux-Montbéliard players
Stavanger IF players
Norway international footballers
Association football forwards
Norwegian expatriate footballers
Expatriate footballers in France
Norwegian expatriate sportspeople in France
Ligue 1 players
Ligue 2 players